David Michael Barclay Sole  (born 8 May 1962) is a former Scotland international rugby union player.

He was appointed Officer of the Order of the British Empire (OBE) in the 1993 New Year Honours.

Rugby Union career

Amateur career

He was educated at Blairmore prep school and Glenalmond College, a private school in Perthshire.

He went to Exeter University and played for their rugby side.

He played for Bath and then moved to play for Edinburgh Academicals.

Provincial career

He played for Scottish Exiles (then Anglo-Scots) in the Scottish Inter-District Championship.

When he moved to play for Edinburgh Academicals, he then turned out for Edinburgh District.

International career

While still with Exeter University rugby club he was capped by Scotland 'B'. He received 5 'B' caps in total.

He made his full senior Scotland debut in 1986 against France and went on to win 44 caps at prop between 1986 and 1992, with a record 25 as captain. He was also the first choice loosehead prop with the victorious British Lions in Australia in 1989.

In 1990, Sole was captain for a Grand Slam decider at Murrayfield against hot favourites England. This is sometimes considered to be Scotland's greatest match, and one well remembered, as Richard Bath wrote:

"David Sole is another of those players who is remembered and virtually defined by one moment: in this case it was when he made the decision for his side to take the now famous walk onto the pitch for the Grand Slam decider against England at Murrayfield in 1990. As a statement of resolve, it was a masterstroke from which the English never recovered as they lost the most high-profile game in Five Nations Rugby history. It also cemented Sole's name in Scottish folklore...

"[David Sole was] one of the game's most softly-spoken and considered men off the field and one of the most inspirational and thoughtful captains and players on it."

Scotland won 13-7, denying England the Grand Slam and claiming their third Grand Slam after their previous triumphs in 1925 and 1984.

He captained a World XV to a victory against the All Blacks in 1992. He made his final international appearance for Scotland in 1992 against Australia. That year he stood for election as Rector of the University of Dundee, but despite being the favourite candidate he was defeated by Stephen Fry.

Media career

Since retiring Sole has worked as a co-commentator for BBC Scotland's coverage of rugby union matches.

Business career

He has also embarked on a successful career outside of sport, becoming Managing Partner of "School for CEOs'" in 2017 as well as Non-executive director of AM Bid Services.

Family

Three of Sole's four children have also represented their country in international sport. His sons Chris and Tom both play for the Scotland cricket team, while his daughter Gemma plays for the Scotland netball team. His other son Jamie is also a rugby player, and played professionally with Newcastle Falcons.

References

Sources

Canny Hadden will have spotted chinks in England's armour, Telegraph, 25 February 2006
Sole backs Scots to shock England, The Scotsman, 15 February 2006
Reasons to be cheerful despite defeat in Cardiff, Telegraph, 14 February 2006
Scanty evidence for Williams' bold boast - Telegraph, 21 March 2005

External links
 David Sole in The Scotsman newspaper
 David Sole, Executive Coaching Consultant
 All Time World XV
 David Sole at Rugby Heroes Part 1
 David Sole at Rugby Heroes Part 2
 David Sole at Rugby Heroes Part 1 (International Caps)
 David Sole at Rugby Heroes Part 2 (International Caps)

1962 births
Living people
Alumni of the University of Exeter
Barbarian F.C. players
Bath Rugby players
British & Irish Lions rugby union players from Scotland
Edinburgh Academicals rugby union players
Edinburgh District (rugby union) players
Officers of the Order of the British Empire
People educated at Blairmore School
People educated at Glenalmond College
Rugby union players from Aylesbury
Rugby union props
Scotland 'B' international rugby union players
Scotland international rugby union players
Scottish Exiles (rugby union) players
Scottish rugby union commentators
Scottish rugby union players